SOB X RBE (an acronym of Strictly Only Brothers x Real Boi Entertainment) is an American hip hop group. The group consists of two active members, DaBoii and Slimmy B. The group was founded in 2016 by Slimmy B (Jabbar Brown), Yhung T.O. (Juwon Lee), DaBoii (Wayman Barrow), and Lul G (George Harris). The group was formed during their teenage years and they worked together to create music. Their sound is highly influenced by the Bay Area and various artists that make up the Hip-Hop and Rap culture of Northern California.

Music career 
As SOB x RBE gained momentum and exposure, in 2017 they caught the eye of Bay Area rapper Sage the Gemini who took the group under apprenticeship and had them be the opening act for his tour. He introduced the group to more prominent names in the music industry to help them gain more momentum. The group has released six complete projects: a self-titled mixtape in 2017, a debut album Gangin in 2018, an EP with Big Money, a second album Gangin II in late 2018, an EP with Marshmello, and an album "Family Not A Group" with producer Hit Boy. The group found mainstream attention after being featured on the track "Paramedic!" for the 2018 superhero film Black Panther. The group has gone on multiple tours around the United States and have been interviewed multiple times by The Fader and Billboard. The group is currently not signed to any recording label but, certain members in the group are signed to record labels as solo independent recording artist. They each have their own specific sound and history that makes them individuals and each group member has their own mixtapes and solo projects that they work on outside of the group. In an interview with DJ Vlad the group disclosed that despite musical differences they will always remain a "family" before a musical group.

Biographies

Juwon Lee (Yhung T.O.) 
Born on December 7, 1998, in Vallejo, California, Yhung T.O. has had a passion for making music since he was in middle school and essentially brought the group together as he was the one with the studio the men began recording their very first hits in. SOB x RBE was a merge of two pre-existing groups, Real Boi Entertainment (RBE) was Yhung T.O.'s musical group, starting as early as ninth grade.  Yhung T.O. had gotten married at the age of nineteen and is still currently married. In March 2018 Yhung T.O. revealed his signing to the record label Interscope.Yhung T.O. was signed by Joie Manda in December 2017. The group expressed that they are still a family, though Yhung T.O. was signed as a solo artist to the label. His signing left fans with unanswered questions as to what is going to happen to the musical group in the long run.

Wayan Barrow (DaBoii) 
Born on August 24, 1997, in Vallejo, California, DaBoii also was making music since he could remember and at a very young age joined Yhung T.O. in his studio where they began to make music. The second half of the musical group's final merge was Strictly Only Brothers (SOB) and this was DaBoii's initial group. During an interview with the musical group, DaBoii revealed  that he is known to be the most soft-spoken among the three and keeps very quiet around those he does not know well. While the group is known for their collaborative music, each member identifies themselves as an independent artist, with DaBoii also taking steps to sign with a record label. In December 2019, DaBoii announced on Instagram he has a son.

Jabbar Brown (Slimmy B) 
Born on February 26, 1997, in Vallejo, California Slimmy B is the third active member of the musical group. Slimmy B's passion to pursue music also started very early on, just like the rest of the group. He attended Vallejo Middle School where he and DaBoii met and formed their relationship. In an interview, Slimmy B revealed that he had a son and before the group had gained exposure he was working at various wineries and warehouses in Vallejo, California to take care of his family.  In an interview with the artists, it was revealed that among the three, Slimmy B seems to be the artist with all the jokes.

George Harris (Lul G) 
Born on November 14, 1998, in Vallejo, California Lul G is currently not an active member in the group as of late 2018. Lul G signed to Def Jam records in the summer of 2018 as a solo artist. KQED reported that the Fairfield Police Department, stated that a Lul G (George Harris) was charged for murder and arrested On September 21, 2019.

He is currently being held in the Stanton Correction Facility in Fairfield, California. Harris is being charged for in connection of the murder of Rashield Flowers a friend to the SOB x RBE and co-worker.

Discography

Studio albums

Mixtapes

Extended plays

Charted songs

Singles

References 

Hip hop groups from California
Musical groups from the San Francisco Bay Area
Musicians from Vallejo, California
Rappers from San Francisco
Hip hop collectives
Interscope Records artists
Def Jam Recordings artists